Aleksandra Tomić (born 26 April 1969) is a politician in Serbia. She has served in the National Assembly of Serbia since 2012 as a member of the Serbian Progressive Party.

Early life and career
Tomić was born in Vranje, in what was then the Socialist Republic of Serbia in the Socialist Federal Republic of Yugoslavia. She is a graduate of the University of Belgrade's Faculty of Mechanical Engineering, holds a master's degree and a Ph.D. from the private Alfa University in Belgrade, and is an associate professor at Alfa University and Belgrade's College of Business Economics and Entrepreneurship. Tomiċ worked for GP Javor from 1997 to 2010 and was subsequently director for the federal institute Plov put and an advisor with the company Srbijavode.

Politician

Municipal politics
Tomić entered political life as a member of the Democratic Party of Serbia (Demokratska stranka Srbije, DSS). This party participated in the 2000 Serbian local elections as part of the Democratic Opposition of Serbia (DOS) alliance, and Tomić was elected to the Zvezdara municipal assembly in Belgrade under the alliance's banner. She was president of the assembly's executive board from 2000 to 2001 and a member of the executive board from 2001 to 2004.

The DSS contested the 2004 Serbian local elections on its own, and Tomić received the eighth position on its electoral list in Zvezdara. The list won eight mandates. She was not chosen for the party's initial delegation to the assembly but instead served as a member of the municipal council – i.e., the executive branch of the municipal government – from 2005 to 2008. (From 2000 to 2011, mandates in Serbian elections were assigned at the discretion of successful parties and coalitions, and it was common practice for the mandates to be awarded out of numerical order. Tomić did not automatically receive a mandate by virtue of her position on the list.)

Tomić also appeared in the fifty-second position on the DSS's list for the City Assembly of Belgrade in the 2004 local elections. The party won thirteen mandates and she was not selected for its delegation. She did not seek re-election in Zvezdara in 2008 and subsequently left the DSS to join the Progressive Party.

Parliamentarian
Serbia's electoral system was reformed in 2011, such that mandates were awarded in numerical order to candidates on successful lists. Tomić received the fifty-fourth position on the Progressive Party's Let's Get Serbia Moving electoral list in the 2012 Serbian parliamentary election and was elected when the list won seventy-three out of 250 mandates. The Progressives formed a coalition government with the Socialist Party of Serbia and other parties after the election, and Tomić served as a member of the government's parliamentary majority. She was promoted to the ninth position on the Progressive-led list in the 2014 parliamentary election and was re-elected when it won a landslide victory with 158 out of 250 mandates. For the 2016 election, she received the sixth position and was elected to a third term when the list won 131 mandates.

During the 2016–20 parliament, Tomić was the chair of the assembly's committee on finance, state budget, and control of public spending; the deputy chair of the committee on the economy, regional development, trade, tourism, and energy; a member of the European Union–Serbia stabilization and association parliamentary committee; the head of the parliamentary friendship group with Italy; and a member of the parliamentary friendship groups with Algeria, Austria, Azerbaijan, Belarus, Bulgaria, China, the Czech Republic, Egypt, France, Germany, Greece, Hungary, India, Indonesia, Israel, Japan, the Netherlands, Romania, Russia, Slovakia, Slovenia, South Korea, Switzerland, Turkey, the United Kingdom, and Venezuela.

On 24 November 2017, Tomić was appointed as the head of Serbia's delegation to the Parliamentary Assembly of the Council of Europe (PACE), replacing Aleksandra Đurović. She is a full member of PACE's committee on legal affairs and human rights, the committee on political affairs and democracy, the monitoring committee on the honouring of obligations and commitments by member states of the Council of Europe, and the sub-committee on human rights. She was also a member of the sub-committee on relations with the Organisation for Economic Co-operation and Development (OECD) and the European Bank for Reconstruction and Development (EBRD) from 2018 to 2019. She serves with the European People's Party (EPP) group. In April 2018, she urged European institutions to condemn the recent arrest of Marko Đurić by Kosovo authorities and the concurrent assault on some Kosovo Serbs by members of the Kosovo Police at a political meeting in North Mitrovica.

Tomić received the 105th position on the Progressive Party's Aleksandar Vučić — For Our Children list in the 2020 election and was elected to a fourth term when the list won a landslide majority with 188 mandates. She continues to chair the assembly's finance committee and serve on the committee on the economy, regional development, trade, tourism, and energy, as well as the stabilization and association committee. She remains a member of Serbia's delegation to the PACE and is a member of the parliamentary friendship groups with Canada, China, France, Germany, Italy, Russia, Slovenia, and Switzerland.

References

1969 births
Living people
People from Vranje
Politicians from Belgrade
21st-century Serbian women politicians
21st-century Serbian politicians
Members of the National Assembly (Serbia)
Members of the Parliamentary Assembly of the Council of Europe
Democratic Party of Serbia politicians
Serbian Progressive Party politicians
European People's Party politicians
Women members of the National Assembly (Serbia)